Moffat Mtonga (born 10 April 1983) is a Zambian retired football midfielder.

References

1983 births
Living people
Zambian footballers
Zambia international footballers
Nkwazi F.C. players
Zamsure F.C. players
Red Arrows F.C. players
Young Arrows F.C. players
Association football midfielders
Sportspeople from Lusaka